Euclydes Barbosa, known by the nickname Jaú (December 7, 1909, São Paulo – February 26, 1988) was an association footballer who played in the central defender position.

In his career, he played for Brazilian teams Corinthians (1934–1938), Vasco da Gama (1939) and Santos FC.

He won two São Paulo State Leagues (1937, 1938) and one Rio de Janeiro State League (1939). Barbosa was on the Brazil national football team roster for the 1938 FIFA World Cup where he played one match.

During his life, Barbosa was persecuted by the Brazilian governments due to his practice of Umbanda. He died at age 78.

References

1909 births
1988 deaths
Footballers from São Paulo
Brazilian footballers
Brazil international footballers
Association football defenders
Sport Club Corinthians Paulista players
CR Vasco da Gama players
Santos FC players
1938 FIFA World Cup players